The council of the Hessequa Local Municipality (previously the Langeberg Local Municipality) consists of seventeen members elected by mixed-member proportional representation. Nine councillors are elected by first-past-the-post voting in nine wards, while the remaining eight are chosen from party lists so that the total number of party representatives is proportional to the number of votes received. In the election of 3 August 2016 no party obtained a majority; the Democratic Alliance (DA) and the Freedom Front Plus (FF+) subsequently formed a coalition to govern the municipality.

The DA won a majority in the 2021 election.

Results 
The following table shows the composition of the council after past elections.

December 2000 election

The following table shows the results of the 2000 election.

By-elections from December 2000 to September 2004
The following by-elections were held to fill vacant ward seats in the period between the election in December 2000 and the floor crossing period in September 2004.

September 2004 floor crossing
In terms of the Eighth Amendment of the Constitution, in the period from 1–15 September 2004 councillors had the opportunity to cross the floor to a different political party without losing their seats. In the Langeberg council one councillor crossed from the Democratic Alliance to the African National Congress.

March 2006 election

The following table shows the results of the 2006 election.

September 2007 floor crossing
The final floor-crossing period occurred on 1–15 September 2007; floor-crossing was subsequently abolished in 2008 by the Fifteenth Amendment of the Constitution. In the Hessequa council, one councillor from the Democratic Alliance (DA) crossed to the African National Congress, while another DA councillor left the party to sit as an independent.

May 2011 election

The following table shows the results of the 2011 election.

By-elections from May 2011 to August 2016
The following by-elections were held to fill vacant ward seats in the period between the elections in May 2011 and August 2016.

August 2016 election

The following table shows the results of the 2016 election.

By-elections from August 2016 to November 2021 
The following by-election was held to fill a vacant ward seat in the period between the elections in August 2016 and November 2021.

November 2021 election

The following table shows the results of the 2021 election.

References

Hessequa
Elections in the Western Cape